Calumma crypticum, commonly known as the cryptic chameleon or blue-legged chameleon, is a species of chameleon found in eastern Madagascar.

Taxonomy
This species was first described in 2006 as Calumma crypticum by Raxworthy & Nussbaum, one of six new species from mountain regions of Madagascar. It is very similar to, and was previously included in, the short-horned chameleon (Calumma brevicorne), but in 2007, Boumans et al. confirmed that it was sufficiently genetically distinct to be considered a valid species.

Description
The species is sexually dimorphic, the male having a longer snout with a horn-like protrusion on its upper surface, which the female lacks. As with other chameleon species, the colour is variable, depending on the colour of the surroundings, the ambient temperature, and variations in the level of light, but this species is usually quite colourful with rich browns, blues and greens, and the legs are often marked with blue.

Distribution and habitat
Its range extends from the Tsaratanana Massif and the Ivakoany Massif. It is an arboreal species, living in humid forests; its distribution is patchy because of forest clearance on the central highlands between the mountain blocks, but there is a subpopulation around Ambohitantely in the central west of the island.

Status
This chameleon has a widespread distribution and occurs in a number of protected areas. Suitable habitat is being cleared for agriculture and the population is gradually declining, however the species is sufficiently common that the International Union for Conservation of Nature has assessed its conservation status as being of least concern.

References

External links
 

crypticum
Endemic fauna of Madagascar
Reptiles described in 2006
Reptiles of Madagascar
Taxa named by Ronald Archie Nussbaum
Taxa named by Christopher John Raxworthy
Fauna of the Madagascar subhumid forests